The United Nations Convention on the Law of the Sea (UNCLOS) is the international agreement that resulted from the third United Nations Conference on the Law of the Sea (UNCLOS III), which took place between 1973 and 1982. The convention was opened for signature on 10 December 1982 and entered into force on 16 November 1994 upon deposition of the 60th instrument of ratification. 

The convention has been ratified by 168 parties, which includes 167 states (164 United Nations member states plus the UN Observer state Palestine, as well as the Cook Islands and Niue) and the European Union. An additional 14 UN member states have signed, but not ratified the convention.  

Subsequently, the "Agreement relating to the implementation of Part XI of the United Nations Convention on the Law of the Sea" was signed in 1994, amending the original Convention. The agreement has been ratified by 151 parties (all of which are parties to the Convention), which includes 150 states (147 United Nations member states plus the UN Observer state Palestine, as well as the Cook Islands and Niue) and the European Union. An additional three UN member states (Egypt, Sudan, USA) have signed, but not ratified the agreement.

As per Article 4 of the Agreement, following adoption of the Agreement any state which ratifies the convention also becomes a party to the Agreement.  Additionally, only states which are parties to the Convention can ratify the Agreement.

List of parties

States with a dagger are landlocked states.

Signatories
An additional 14 UN member states have signed the Convention but have not ratified it. One UN member state has signed the Agreement but has not ratified it.

Other states
There are 15 United Nations member and observer states which have neither signed nor acceded either the Convention or the Agreement:

United States position 

Although the United States helped shape the Convention and its subsequent revisions, and though it signed the 1994 Agreement on Implementation, it has not signed the Convention as it objected to Part XI of the Convention.

In 1983 President Ronald Reagan, through Proclamation No. 5030, claimed a 200-mile exclusive economic zone. In December 1988 President Reagan, through Proclamation No. 5928, extended U.S. territorial waters from three nautical miles to twelve nautical miles for national security purposes. However a legal opinion from the Justice Department questioned the President's constitutional authority to extend sovereignty as Congress has the power to make laws concerning the territory belonging to the United States under the U.S. Constitution. In any event, Congress needs to make laws defining if the extended waters, including oil and mineral rights, are under state or federal control.

On 16 July 2012, the U.S. Senate had 34 Republican Senators who indicated their intention to vote against ratification of the treaty if it came to a vote. Since at least two-thirds of the 100 member Senate (at least 67 Senators) are required to ratify a treaty, consideration of the treaty was deferred again.

Some American commentators, including former Secretary of Defense Donald Rumsfeld, have warned that ratification of the Law of the Sea Treaty might create a precedent with regard to resources of outer space.

References

United Nations Convention on the Law of the Sea